John Edward Byrne (born 17 January 1972 in Dublin) is a former Irish cricketer. A right-handed batsman, he played three times for Ireland in 1997, including one first-class match against Scotland. He has not played for Ireland since.

References

1972 births
Living people
Irish cricketers
Cricketers from County Dublin